Margareta Clausdotter (died 10 December 1486) was a Swedish writer and genealogist, a Roman Catholic nun of the Bridgettine order and from 1473 until her death, abbess of the Vadstena Abbey. Christina Brask  translated the  Antiphonarium  for her.

She is best known for the chronicle she authored on the family of Saint Bridget, which includes some legends and stories not known from any other sources. Her chronicle influenced later historical and genealogical writers. One story, about "Bengt Lagman", the king's brother who marries a woman of humbler origins, "Sigrid the Beautiful", has been most famously retold in the play Bröllopet på Ulfåsa (1865) by  Swedish dramatist, Frans Hedberg  (1828–1908)  and the music written for the play by August Söderman (1832–1876). Bengt Lagman was the story of Bengt Magnusson (died 1294), however the story for the most part disagrees with, or is at least not verified by, contemporary sources.

References

Other sources
Brilioth, Yngve, "Bengt Magnusson", Svenskt biografiskt lexikon, vol. 3 (1922), p. 193–195.

1486 deaths
Year of birth missing
Bridgettine nuns
Swedish genealogists
Swedish Roman Catholic abbesses
15th-century Swedish women writers
15th-century Swedish writers
Swedish women biographers
15th-century Swedish nobility
15th-century Swedish nuns
Swedish biographers